Rangga Muslim Perkasa (born 3 May 1994), is an Indonesian professional footballer who plays as a midfielder for and captains Liga 1 club Dewa United.

Club career

Bhayangkara
He was signed for Bhayangkara to play in Liga 1 in the 2020 season. This season was suspended on 27 March 2020 due to the COVID-19 pandemic. The season was abandoned and was declared void on 20 January 2021.

Dewa United
In 2021, Rangga Muslim signed a contract with Indonesian Liga 2 club Dewa United. He made his league debut on 5 October against Perserang Serang at the Gelora Bung Karno Madya Stadium, Jakarta.

Honours

Club
PSS Sleman
 Liga 2: 2018
Dewa United
 Liga 2 third place (play-offs): 2021

References

External links
 Rangga Muslim at Soccerway
 Rangga Muslim at Liga Indonesia

1994 births
Living people
Indonesian footballers
Association football midfielders
PSS Sleman players
Persebaya Surabaya players
PSIM Yogyakarta players
Bhayangkara F.C. players
Liga 1 (Indonesia) players
Liga 2 (Indonesia) players
Sportspeople from West Nusa Tenggara
People from Bima Regency
Dewa United F.C. players